= ITCRA =

The Information Technology Contract and Recruitment Association (ITCRA), incorporated on 8 December 1998 and based in Melbourne, Australia, was an association of CEOs in the IT contract and recruitment industry that acted as a voice for the IT recruitment sector.

== Overview ==
At the time of its existence, ITCRA was a recognized voice in IT recruitment circles.

The organization believed that there was a perception that a lack of professionalism was emerging, leading to an unfavorable view of their field. They came to believe that the industry needed the sort of leadership that could only be provided by an industry specific body. Their goal was to make the industry more efficient by the development of common form contracts, industry specific training programs for staff and contractors, recruitment forums and other projects in which they had a common interest.

The organization merged with APSco Global to form a new organization, APSCO Australia, in 2016.

== Objectives ==
The Association's objectives are to:

- Enhance and promote the information technology contract and recruitment industry
- Establish a Code of Conduct consistent with good practice and sound business objectives
- Promote the professionalism and image of the industry
- Conduct training and educational activities for the industry
- Provide an industry forum/lobby group for specialist IT recruitment and contract labour providers
